Sucha Singh  may refer to:

Baba Sucha Singh, Indian politician
Sucha Singh Chhotepur, Indian politician
Sucha Singh Langah, Indian politician